Demise of Eros was a metalcore band from Pittsburgh, Pennsylvania that formed in late 2003. The band signed to Strike First Records, a subsidiary of Facedown Records. The band disbanded in 2006.

Biography
The band formed with Vocalist Darren Belajac, Guitarists John Ericson and Steve Stout, Bassist Chris Urbanek, and Drummer Giuseppe "Gypsy" Capolupo.

The band signed to Strike First Records and released their first album Neither Storm Nor Quake Nor Fire on August 22, 2006.

They were named one of The Daily News In Tune Magazine's "IT Bands" of 2005, were declared by WXDX FM 105.9 as "the best metal band ever to come out of Pittsburgh", and toured with notable acts such as War of Ages, Twelve Gauge Valentine, Unearth, Terror, Haste the Day, Remembering Never, The Acacia Strain, God Forbid, Bury Your Dead, August Burns Red, and Symphony in Peril.

The band disbanded in late 2006, citing that many of them did not want to tour for the rest of their lives and that "This decision had not been reached due to any personal antipathy on anyone's part."

Name
Contrary to what one may believe, Demise of Eros does not mean 'the death of love.' As stated on their Myspace and Purevolume:

Members
Last Known Line-up
 Darren Belajac - vocals (2003-2006)
 Will Curtis - bass (2006)
 Joey Solak - drums (2005-2006)

Former Members
 Chris Urbanek - bass (2003-2006)
 Giuseppe Capolupo - drums (2003-2005)
 Steve Stout - lead guitar, backing vocals (2003-2006)
 John Erickson - rhythm guitar (2003-2006)

Touring Members
 Chris Arnold - lead guitar, backing vocals (2006)
 Joel Cunningham - rhythm guitar (2006)

Timeline

Discography
EPs
 Demise of Eros EP (2004)
 Another Night of the Same Charade EP (2005)
Studio albums
 Neither Storm Nor Quake Nor Fire (2006)

References

External links

Metalcore musical groups from Pennsylvania
Musical groups from Pittsburgh
Heavy metal musical groups from Pennsylvania
Musical groups established in 2003
Musical groups disestablished in 2006
Strike First Records artists